Nevercenter Ltd. Co. is a private company founded in 2003 and based near Salt Lake City, Utah. The company is a small team devoted to the development of software for Windows, Mac, and mobile platforms. Prominent titles include:

Silo, a 3D modeling application using subdivision surfaces for Windows and Mac OS. Originally released August 2003; Silo 2 released August 2007.
CameraBag, a photo editing app available for the iPhone, iPad, Mac, and PC. 2012 Mac App of the Year Runner-Up. Originally released for iOS in September 2008 as a vintage photo filter app, Mac support was added in September 2009. The program was then redesigned and updated to "CameraBag 2" in 2012 as a full image editing application for Mac and PC, with the iOS version of CameraBag 2 following soon after.
Shibuya, a fast-paced falling block-based puzzle game, currently available for iPhone and iPad. "Pax 10" Indie Game Winner, 2010. Released September 2010, during the 2010 PAX Prime conference.
Infinicam, a photo filtering app for iPhone released in September 2010.

References

External links
 Official site: http://www.nevercenter.com
 Facebook page: https://www.facebook.com/nevercenter
 Silo: http://nevercenter.com/silo
 CameraBag for Mac and PC: http://nevercenter.com/camerabag/desktop/
 CameraBag for iPhone: https://itunes.apple.com/us/app/camerabag-2/id582697694?mt=8
 CameraBag for iPad: https://itunes.apple.com/us/app/camerabag-2-hd/id586039480?mt=8
 Shibuya: https://itunes.apple.com/us/app/shibuya/id327297971?mt=8
 Infinicam: https://itunes.apple.com/us/app/infinicam/id388837429?mt=8

Software companies based in Utah
Companies based in Salt Lake City
2003 establishments in Utah
Software companies of the United States